Panus Bridge  is a bridge in Depok, West Java, Indonesia which connected Bogor and Batavia in the Dutch period in Indonesia. At the same time, this bridge had a primary function that is one road to across Jakarta to doing some working the by people in Depok.

References

Buildings and structures in Depok
Bridges in Indonesia